A rubber chicken is a prop used in comedy. The phrase is also used as a description for food served at speeches, conventions, and other large meetings, and as a metaphor for speechmaking.

Description
A rubber chicken is an imitation plucked fowl made in a latex injection mold.

Origins 
The origin of the rubber chicken is obscure, but it is possibly based on the use of inflated pig bladders attached to sticks and used as props or mock weapons by jesters in the days before the development of plastic and latex. Chicken corpses were readily available; therefore jesters could employ them as variations of slapsticks.

One account attributes the first use of a prop chicken to John Holmberg, the Swedish blackface clown of the early 1900s. Similarly British performer Joseph Grimaldi would perform with his pockets full of fake food to mock the gluttony reportedly prevalent among the upper classes at the time. However this predates the vulcanization of rubber. 

A claim that the symbol originated during the French Revolution, with soldiers hanging a chicken from their muskets for luck, is printed on the tag of rubber chickens manufactured by Archie McPhee.

Food and speechmaking
The term "rubber chicken" is used disparagingly to describe the food served at political or corporate events, weddings, and other gatherings where there are a large number of guests who require serving in a short timeframe. Often, pre-cooked chicken is held at serving temperature for some time and then dressed with a sauce as it is served. Consequently, the meat may be tough or "rubbery". Someone who "travels the 'rubber chicken circuit'" is said to do so by attending or making speeches at many such gatherings, often as part of political campaigning.

References 

Chickens
Rubber toys
Toy animals
Prop design
Novelty items